Tilaurakot is a neighborhood in Kapilvastu Municipality in Kapilvastu District, in the Lumbini Province of southern Nepal. Previously it was a Village development committee. At the time of the 1991 Nepal census it had a population of 5684 people living in 944 individual households.

Tilaurakot may be the location of the ancient Shakyan city of Kapilavastu, where Gautama Buddha spent the first 29 years of his life. The site was listed as a UNESCO tentative site in 1996 by the Nepalese government.

History
The 19th-century search for the historical site of Kapilavastu followed the accounts left by Faxian and later by Xuanzang, who were Chinese Buddhist monks who made early pilgrimages to the site. Some archaeologists have identified the Tilaurakot archeological site as the location for the historical site of Kapilavastu, while others claim it was 16 km away at Piprahwa in the Indian state of Uttar Pradesh.

Tilaurakot was discovered by PC Mukherji in 1899 tracing the journey of those two Chinese monks following the history, they were visited Tilaurakot in the 3rd and 6th centuries AD. Archeologists believe that it was the civic center from 9th century BC to 3rd Century AD. Experts have discovered the palaces, temples, monuments, sculptures, ponds, roads and some believe that the place was the capital of Shakya Kingdom and home town of Buddha. Some of the objects found during the excavation are kept in Kapilvastu Museum near the Tilaurakot which is being displayed for the visitors.

UNESCO Tentative Listed Site
Archaeological excavation is still going on as of now at Tilaurakot and it is believed by some to be the ancient palace of King Suddhodhana, father of Buddha. Three palaces believed to be that of King Suddhodama are being explored by excavation. It was listed as a UNESCO tentative site in 1996 by the Nepalese government.

References

Further reading
Davis, C. E. et al. (2016).  Re-investigating Tilaurakot’s Ancient Fortifications: A Preliminary Report of Excavations Through the Northern Rampart of Tilaurakot. Ancient Nepal 190, 30-46
Coningham, R.A.E.; Acharya, K.P.; Manuel, M.J. and Davis, C.E.; Kunwar, R.B.; Simpson, I.A.; Strickland, K.M.; Smaghur, E.; Tremblay, J.; Lafortune-Bernard, A. (2018). Archaeological investigations at Tilaurakot-Kapilavastu, 2014-2016, Ancient Nepal 197-198, 5-59

Populated places in Kapilvastu District
Buddhist pilgrimage sites in Nepal
Archaeological sites in Nepal